Ao Vivo no Estúdio Showlivre is the second EP by Brazilian singer Luciana Andrade. The EP was released on May 13, 2013, on its official website and includes the first official single from his "Mind and Heart" career.

Track listing

References

Luciana Andrade albums
2013 EPs